San Ramón Municipality may refer to:
 San Ramón Municipality, Beni, in Beni Department, Bolivia
 San Ramón Municipality (Santa Cruz), in Santa Cruz Department, Bolivia
 San Ramón, Matagalpa, El Salvador
 San Ramón, Cuscatlán, Nicaragua

Municipality name disambiguation pages